Wolfgang Freiherr von Stetten (born 22 January 1941 in Niederwartha) is a German lawyer and politician of the Christian Democratic Union of Germany (CDU). He served as Member of Parliament (the Bundestag) from 1990 to 2002. He represented the constituency of Schwäbisch Hall – Hohenlohe, and was succeeded by his son Christian von Stetten.

Early life and education
Wolfgang von Stetten earned a doctorate in law in 1972, with the dissertation Die Rechtsstellung der freien unmittelbaren Reichsritterschaft, ihre Mediatisierung und ihre Stellung in den neuen Landen. From 1974 to 1984, he was a judge, and from 1984 to 1991, he served as Professor of Law at Heilbronn College. He is a member of the noble Franconian Stetten family, and owns his family seat, Schloss Stetten.

Political career
As a member of parliament, von Stetten served on the Committee on Legal Affairs and as CDU/CSU spokesman for several years. He founded the German-Baltic Parliamentary Association in 1991 and served as its chair to 2002. The association supported the independence of the Baltic countries from the Soviet Union, and their membership in NATO and the European Union. From 1997 to 2001, he served as President of Studienzentrum Weikersheim. He has been the Lithuanian Consul in Baden-Württemberg since 2004. He is also an active member of several charitable societies.

Honours
1989 Freiherr-vom-Stein-Medaille
1990 Federal Cross of Merit
1996 Lithuanian Order of Gedimino
1996 Estonian Order of the Cross of Terra Mariana First Class
2002 Latvian Order of the Three Stars Third Class
2003 Honorary citizen of Kelme, Lithuania

References

External links
 

1941 births
Members of the Bundestag for Baden-Württemberg
Members of the Bundestag 1998–2002
Members of the Bundestag 1994–1998
Members of the Bundestag 1990–1994
Recipients of the Cross of the Order of Merit of the Federal Republic of Germany
Living people
Recipients of the Order of the Cross of Terra Mariana, 1st Class
Honorary consuls of Lithuania
Members of the Bundestag for the Christian Democratic Union of Germany